Mathieu Betts (born March 22, 1995) is a professional Canadian football defensive linemen for the BC Lions of the Canadian Football League (CFL). Betts is the only player in U Sports football history to have won four major individual awards after he won the 2015 Peter Gorman Trophy as the most outstanding rookie and the 2016–2018 J. P. Metras Trophy awards as the most outstanding down lineman. He is a two-time Vanier Cup champion having won in 2016 and 2018.

University career
Betts began his U Sports football career with the Laval Rouge et Or in 2015 where he recorded a nation-leading 12 sacks in eight regular season games played en route to being named the Most Outstanding Rookie. In 2016, he had nine sacks in eight regular season games, second-best in the country, and was named the Most Outstanding Down Lineman at season's end. He also won his first Vanier Cup championship as part of Laval's 52nd Vanier Cup win. He won his second consecutive J. P. Metras Trophy in 2017 and won for the third time in 2018, becoming the first player to ever win the award three times. He finished his fourth year of eligibility in 2018 with another Vanier Cup championship in the 54th Vanier Cup game.

Professional career
In the 2019 CFL Scouting Bureau Rankings for December, Betts was named as the top available prospect in the 2019 CFL Draft. He was one of two U Sports players invited to play in the 2019 East–West Shrine Game. On May 2, he was selected third overall in the 2019 CFL Draft by the Edmonton Eskimos, though at the time he was under contract with the Chicago Bears.

Chicago Bears 
After the 2019 NFL Draft on April 27, 2019, Betts signed with the Chicago Bears of the National Football League as an undrafted free agent on a three-year contract. Betts was among the final roster cuts on August 31, 2019.

Edmonton Eskimos / Elks 
Betts formally joined the Edmonton Eskimos on September 9, 2019, after being selected by the Eskimos in the first round of the 2019 CFL Draft. In his first game, Betts made a major contribution in making a sack, forcing a fumble against the Hamilton Tiger-Cats. The following week against the Ottawa Redblacks, Betts had another sack. In total, he played in six games and recorded one defensive tackle, two sacks, and one forced fumble in his rookie season. He did not play in 2020 due to the cancellation of the 2020 CFL season.

In 2021, Betts played in 13 of the 14 regular season games where he had 12 defensive tackles, but did not record a sack. He became a free agent upon the expiry of his contract on February 8, 2022.

BC Lions
On the first day of free agency, on February 8, 2022, Betts signed with the BC Lions. Betts played in all 17 regular season games and contributed with 26 defensive tackles, seven sacks and two tackles on special teams. Following the season, in early January 2023, he had a workout with the Jacksonville Jaguars.

References

External links
BC Lions bio
Laval bio
2019 East West Shrine Game Prospect Interview: Mathieu Betts, Laval via YouTube

1995 births
Living people
Canadian football defensive linemen
French Quebecers
Gridiron football people from Quebec
Laval Rouge et Or football players
Canadian football people from Montreal
Players of Canadian football from Quebec
Chicago Bears players
Edmonton Elks players
BC Lions players